Neaetha is a genus of jumping spiders that was first described by Eugène Louis Simon in 1885.

Species
 it contains thirteen species, found only in Asia, Europe, and Africa:
Neaetha absheronica Logunov & Guseinov, 2002 – Albania, Macedonia, Greece, Turkey, Azerbaijan
Neaetha alborufula Caporiacco, 1949 – Kenya
Neaetha catula Simon, 1886 – East, Southern Africa
Neaetha catulina Berland & Millot, 1941 – Mali
Neaetha cerussata (Simon, 1868) – Mediterranean
Neaetha fulvopilosa (Lucas, 1846) – Algeria, Tunisia
Neaetha irreperta Wesolowska & Russell-Smith, 2000 – Tanzania, South Africa
Neaetha maxima Wesolowska & Russell-Smith, 2011 – Nigeria
Neaetha membrosa (Simon, 1868) (type) – Western Mediterranean to Germany
Neaetha oculata (O. Pickard-Cambridge, 1876) – Botswana, Nigeria, Egypt, Israel, Saudi Arabia, Yemen, United Arab Emirates
Neaetha ravoisiaei (Lucas, 1846) – Algeria, East Africa
Neaetha tomkovichi Logunov, 2019 – India
Neaetha wesolowskae Żabka & Patoleta, 2020 – Thailand

References

Salticidae genera
Salticidae
Spiders of Africa
Spiders of Asia